Pagotto is an Italian surname. Notable people with the surname include:

 Angelo Pagotto (born 1973), Italian football goalkeeper
 Antonio Pagotto, or Toni Pagot (1921–2001), Italian comics artist and animator
 Mario Pagotto (1911–1992), Italian football defender

See also
 Carpenterie Pagotto, Italian aircraft manufacturer
 Pagotto Brakogyro, a series of Italian autogyros
 Pagotto Brako, an Italian ultralight trike

Italian-language surnames